The 1951–52 Scottish Cup was the 67th staging of Scotland's most prestigious football knockout competition. The Cup was won by Motherwell who defeated Dundee in the final.

First round

Replays

Second Replays

Second round

Replays

Third round

Replays

Quarter-finals

Replays

Semi-finals

Replays

Second Replays

Final

See also
1951–52 in Scottish football
1951–52 Scottish League Cup

Scottish Cup seasons
Scottish Cup, 1951-52
Scot